Perna is a surname. Notable people with the surname include:

Armando Perna (born 1981), Italian football central defender
Gustave F. Perna (born 1960), United States Army general
Martín Perna (born 1975), American educator and artist
Pietro Perna (1519–1582), Italian printer
Rosalba Perna, Italian-American astrophysicist